The New Zealand Flag Institute was established in 2005 amidst a campaign by the NZ Flag.com Trust for a referendum to change the New Zealand flag. The campaign to bring about a citizens initiated referendum on the subject subsequently failed.

History 
The organisation was founded by Aucklander John Cox (1965-2017), a New Zealand vexillolographer and lawyer.

Aims 
The Institute's primary aim is to educate New Zealanders about the history and symbolism of the New Zealand Flag. The Institute also aims to encourage people to understand and appreciate what the flag stands for. It also encourages New Zealanders to fly the flag whenever and wherever possible.

See also 
 New Zealand flag debate

References

External links
  New Zealand Flag Institute Trust
  New Zealand Flag Institute Trust

Political organisations based in New Zealand
2005 establishments in New Zealand